Amrinder Singh Sandhu (born 26 September 1989), also known as Manni Sandhu, is a British record producer associated with Punjabi music. He is most known for working with a number of Punjabi singers such as Manak-E, the late Kaka Bhaniawala, Bakshi Billa, Prabh Gill, Lehmber Hussainpuri and many more. He released his debut album My Time in February 2012 which included his No. 1 single with Bakshi Billa "Sona", and hit song with Manak-E "Door Ni Kulne", as well as six further tracks that charted in the official UK Asian Music Download Chart. Since releasing his first album, he has worked with a number of singers such as Prabh Gill, and later released his third album Against All Odds in 2014.

Early life 
Amrinder Singh Sandhu was raised in Southall, London, and moved to Newcastle Upon Tyne at a young age. He began his passion for music at the age of 13, remixing Punjabi music with hip hop, R&B, garage, and drum and bass. He released a number of underground mixtapes under the name 'Dj Manni' titled Solid Sounds and Supremacy. He then began DJing at live Punjabi events around Newcastle furthering his name in the local area and creating links with local DJs and producers. It was at the age of 15 when Sandhu began to produce his own music from his bedroom using a basic computer. As he progressed in the music production field he released a number of mixtapes titled Unsigned Hype and Mutual Concept, alongside JsL. Sandhu was signed to Brown Boi Music in December 2008 and began working on his debut album which was later titled My Time.

Career

My Time (2012) 

My Time was released on 23 February 2012. It featured the vocals of Manak-E, Lehmber Hussainpuri, the late Kaka Bhaniawala, Bakshi Billa, Jelly Manjitpuri, Jaswinder Daghamia, Ashok Gill, and Nirmal Sidhu. The first single from the album "Door Ni Kulne" featuring Manak-E was released in October 2010 and was essentially Sandhu's entry into the Punjabi music industry. It was a worldwide success and received over one million YouTube hits, making him one of the first UK born music directors to achieve this. The second single from the album "Sona" featuring Bakshi Billa was released in February 2012, and was No. 1 on the Official UK Asian Download Chart. Further songs that charted from the album were "Bottle" feat. Lehmber Hussainpuri, "Gidhian Di Rani" feat. Jelly Manjitpuri, "Pegg 2012" feat. Jaswinder Daghamia, "Balle Balle" feat. Ashok Gill, "Jaan Sadi" feat. Nirmal Sidhu, and "Husna Di Sarkar" feat. Kaka Bhaniawala, and "Mutiyaar" feat. Malkit Bulla.

On 7 May 2012, Sandhu took part in the Camden Crawl with BBC Radio 1 host Nihal.

2013 - Today 
On 1 January 2013, Sandhu released a mixtape under Collab Creations Ltd. entitled Reload. The mixtape brought back the UK garage sound from the early 2000s, and was released as a free download.

In 2013, Abhishek Bachchan performed to Sandhu's song "Bottle" featuring Lehmber Hussainpuri at the TOIFA awards in Vancouver. It was the only Punjabi song used in the performance.

He also worked on a second album to be titled Against All Odds released in 2015.

On 27 February 2014, Sandhu released "Friday" featuring Manjit Pappu. "Friday" went straight to number 2 in BBC Asian Network's Official Download Chart in its first week of release.

In 2017 he won Best Single for "Gani" at Brit Asia TV Music Awards (BAMA). He won Best Music Producer at BAMA 2019.

Controversy 

In 2019, singer Dilraj Grewal, who previously was supposed to sing Verified Jatt, but later got dropped due to unknown reasons, had accused Manni Sandhu of stealing the song above.  But after the legal process, the song which was produced by Sangra Vibes was completely rewritten and composed later.  All of the accusations towards Manni Sandhu proved to be false in this way. The song was then sung by Gurj Sidhu.

Discography

Studio Albums

Mixtape albums

Singles discography

Production discography

References

1989 births
Living people
English Sikhs
English people of Indian descent
English people of Punjabi descent
English record producers